Princess Battles is a visual novel video game with a raising sim themed card battle system for Microsoft Windows, macOS and Linux, developed and published by Nekomura Games.

Gameplay
During the game, the player has the ability to go to various places in and around the castle. The player can talk with other characters, make decisions, and influence their relationship to them. Based on the decisions the player made, the game will end differently. Beside the visual novel elements, the game contains a turn-based card battle system. The player has to raise three stats to a certain number in order to win. Therefore, different cards are available. Some raise the stats of the player, others lower the stats of the opponent. The game contains a story mode and a freeplay mode. Within the freeplay mode, the player can trade cards, customize their deck, and battle various characters.

Plot

The player starts off as a rebellious princess who refuses to marry Edmond, the prince of a neighboring kingdom. In addition to this, her place on the throne is threatened by a seemingly perfect rival: Olivia. In order to show the people of her kingdom that she is more worthy for the throne, the player must learn to play the game 'prima' and eventually defeat Olivia in the Prima tournament. Throughout the game the player is able to interact with many different characters which effect the game's ending.

Characters

Rosalind - Aimee Smith
 Rosalind is a maid that works in Albus castle. She loves to gossip and is known for her vast knowledge. Rosalind can often be found in the main hall, where the player can interact with her.

Aurelia - Amber Lee Connors
Lena - Jill Harris
Amaryllis - Britt Meyer
Olivia - Michelle Rojas
Leonine - Lindsey S.
Cyra - Terri Doty
Audrey - Apphia Yu
Lillian - Kimberley Anne
Edmond - KJ McCarthy (Credited as Kei McCarthy)
Lucian - James Goins
Gerald - Johan B.
Ignatius - David Young

Development
Princess Battles was created with Ren'py and was in development for over two years. Several voice actors provided some lines for the game. The game was written in English and features anime-like graphics. The game was re-released on April 13, 2015 with additional content and the German translation on Steam.

Reception
Gamertell rated Princess Battles B+, stating: "If you like princess dating sim games (or really any dating sim games) but are tired of the same old button clicking stat building, then you should check out Princess Battles. You might also like it if you are into card battling games and looking for a little something different." VNs Now! gave a rating of 8/10, opining: "Princess Battles isn’t the best written EVN of the year or the best looking or even the most memorable. But, it has something just as good as the last three: it is the most fun."

References

External links
 Official website
 

2012 video games
Linux games
Otome games
Ren'Py games
Video games developed in the United States
Video games featuring female protagonists
Video games with alternate endings
Visual novels
Windows games